Ruby Dickson is an American politician and economist serving as a member of the Colorado House of Representatives for the 37th district. Elected in November 2022, she assumed office on January 9, 2023.

Education 
Dickson earned a Bachelor of Arts degree in economics and Chinese from Lawrence University and a Master of Philosophy in economics from the University of Oxford.

Career 
In 2014, Dickson was a legislative assistant for Congressman Jared Polis. From 2016 to 2019, she was a senior consulting analyst at Optum. In 2020 and 2021, she worked as a research assistant at the Blavatnik School of Government. Since 2021, she has worked as a research economist at Rethink Priorities. Dickson was elected to the Colorado House of Representatives in November 2022.

References 

Living people
Colorado Democrats
Members of the Colorado House of Representatives
Women state legislators in Colorado
Lawrence University alumni
Alumni of the University of Oxford
Year of birth missing (living people)